SIMUL8 simulation software is a product of the SIMUL8 Corporation used for simulating systems that involve processing of discrete entities at discrete times. This program is a tool for planning, design, optimization and reengineering of real production, manufacturing, logistic or service provision systems. SIMUL8 allows its user to create a computer model, which takes into account real life constraints, capacities, failure rates, shift patterns, and other factors affecting the total performance and efficiency of production. Through this model it is possible to test real scenarios in a virtual environment, for example simulate planned function and load of the system, change parameters affecting system performance, carry out extreme-load tests, verify by experiments the proposed solutions and select the optimal solution. A common feature of problems solved in SIMUL8 is that they are concerned with cost, time and inventory.

SIMUL8 uses dynamic discrete simulation, which makes it possible to provide unambiguous and concrete results and proofs – information on how the designed or optimized production system will actually function. The outputs of SIMUL8 simulation are "hard data", values and statistics of performance parameters and metrics of the production system.

Model building
Construction of  SIMUL8 models is usually not based on programming or statistical data, but rather on drawing organization schemes on the screen. However, SIMUL8 implements a two-way interface with Visual Basic, which leaves space for creation of advanced model features, which cannot be modeled using only the graphical interface. SIMUL8 also provides its own simulation language optimized for simulation processing, called Visual Logic, which allows the user to implement detailed logic of the simulation. The design of SIMUL8 also facilitates communication with other software packages such as Microsoft Access, Excel and Visio. The support of XML and OLE automation allows working with external sources of data and exporting internal data to other systems. SIMUL8 also supports communication with databases using SQL.

Basic components of SIMUL8 environment

A SIMUL8 simulation revolves around processing work items. They enter the system via work entry points, pass through work centers, may temporarily reside in storage areas and leave via work exit points. In addition to this mechanism, work centers may need specific resources to process work items. A simulation consists of a number of these objects and of the routes between them, modeled as a directed graph.

Simul8 also provides advanced simulation objects such as conveyors, vehicles, and tanks and pipes. Simul8 also provides further modelling objects such as Value Steam Mapping and BPMN objects to enable simulation of other process formats. Primarily it is a discrete event simulation tool, it also has continuous and agent based functionality, it is a hybrid simulation tool.

Typical inputs and outputs

These are the most common parameters of a SIMUL8 model, which are set by the user to influence the conditions of simulated environment:
 cycle times
 production rate
 capacity of production equipment
 arrival/order rates
 production rates of production equipment
 statistics of production equipment failures

The outputs of the simulation provide information about:
 utilization of production equipment
 identification of bottlenecks
 production system performance 
 inventory levels

Areas of use

SIMUL8 can be used to model any process where there is a flow of work, however the main areas of use are in manufacturing, health care, contact centers, automotives and supply chain.

SIMUL8 can be used to simulate different kinds of:
 manufacturing systems such as assembly line models or models of material flow during production
 logic systems such as model of manipulation with material between storage, manufacturing and expedition, models of storage expeditionary systems or models of logistic services for distribution centers
 administrative workflows such as model of received orders
 client service systems or service delivery such as model of customer attendance at  banks, models of call center customer attendance or models of customer attendance at hypermarket cash desks

Simul8 Cloud

Simul8 is the only simulation tool on the market that is fully cloud enabled, allowing you to build, run and share simulations online. Their online version is a complete replica of their desktop version, so users can switch between both with ease, and all functionality available in the desktop version is available in their online version. In addition all users are provided with free online sharing functionality which allows you to share simulations with others without them needing to install anything. Simul8 also provides ASP functionality allowing you to use their web tool as a service passing information silently to their service for processing, this is ideal for embedding their software in your website services.

See also 
 Discrete event simulation
 Computer model
 Process optimization
 Simulation software
 list of discrete event simulation software

References

External links
 SIMUL8 Homepage
 SIMUL8 blog

Simulation software
COVID-19 models